The following is a list of districts and sub-districts in Badung Regency. Badung Regency comprises 6 districts, 16 sub-districts, and 46 villages. In 2022, the population was estimated at 549,251, with an area of 418.522 km² and a density of 1,312 people/km².

List of districts and sub-districts in Badung Regency as follows:

References

See also 
 List of districts of Indonesia
 List of districts of Bali
 Subdivisions of Indonesia

External links 
  Official Website Statistical Bureau of Badung Regency
  Official Website Bali Province
  Official Website Badung Regency

Badung Regency
Badung Regency